Takayus lunulatus is a species of comb-footed spider in the family Theridiidae. It is found in China, the far east of Russia, and Korea.

References

Theridiidae
Spiders described in 1993
Spiders of Asia